John McAtee (1910-2003) was a Scottish international lawn bowler. He was known as Jock McAtee during his playing days.

Bowls career
He won a silver medal in the fours at the 1972 World Outdoor Bowls Championship in Worthing. He also won a gold medal in the team event (Leonard Trophy).

He earned a record 69 international caps. and won the 1948 pairs title and 1985 triples title at the Scottish National Bowls Championships when bowling for the Catrine Bowls Club.

References

Scottish male bowls players
1910 births
2003 deaths
Sportspeople from East Ayrshire